Gorbea or Gorbeia is a mountain and massif in the Basque Country, Spain. The massif covers a wide area between the two provinces. The main summit is a round grass-covered mountain crowned by a 17-metre-tall metallic cross. Historically, it was one of the five  of Biscay, from where meetings to the Juntas Generales of the Lordship of Biscay were announced.

The southern side of the mountain is less craggy, being covered by forests.

Since 1994, the whole massif has been part of the Gorbeia Natural Park, established to preserve the local beech and oak forests as well as the populations of wild boars and deer. Its status as the highest summit in two provinces and easy access have made it one of the most emblematic mountains in the Basque Country.

Summit cross

First cross
In 1899, Pope Leo XIII ordered crosses built atop prominent mountains in the Christian world to commemorate the new century. It was decided that a cross would be installed at Gorbea, the highest mountain in Biscay and Álava. The priests of Zeanuri in Biscay and Zigoitia in Álava made the first steps coordinating the construction of the cross. The works, funded by donations, were undertaken by the Diocese of Vitoria. The total budget was of 50,000 pesetas. It was designed by architect Casto de Zavala and built in a factory owned by businessman and politician Serapio de Goicoechea. Works started on 26 July 1901, with the intention of being completed by 14 September (the Feast of the Cross), but it wasn't inaugurated until 12 November.

The construction of the cross was marred with difficulties. The parts of the disassembled cross was hauled by rail to Izarra, and then carried to the summit with the help of working animals. The proposed designs included guy-wires to help the structure withstand the strong winds, but due to the hurried construction they weren't added. The crossed collapsed just one month later, on 12 December.

Second cross
Plans to rebuild the cross started soon after the collapse of the first one. The design was similar to the original. It was inaugurated on 1 October 1903 in a ceremony with a large attendance, which included the blessing of the cross with water from the Jordan river. The second cross lasted for slightly longer than two years, being torn down on 12 February 1906 by the wind.

Third cross
To avoid the negative impact of the destruction of the first two crosses, the third one was built without publicity. As a result, few details are known about its construction. The cross was finished around 1910, although some sources cite 1907 as either the year in which construction started or was completed. The cross, reminiscent of the Eiffel tower, is supported by four legs which are joined at the top. The two northern legs sit in Biscay while the other two sit in Álava. In June 1963, an image of Our Lady of Begoña was added under the cross. The cross was renovated in 1991 and again in 2019.

References

External links
 
 Ascent from Murua
 Ascent from Barazar

Mountains of Biscay
Basque Mountains
Mountains of the Basque Country (autonomous community)
Mountains of Álava